Joe McCall (6 July 1886 – 3 February 1965) was an English professional footballer, playing centre half.

He appeared for Preston North End and England, playing for the Deepdale club for 20 seasons before retiring in 1924.

References

External links 
England Football Online

1886 births
1965 deaths
People from Kirkham, Lancashire
English footballers
England international footballers
English Football League players
Preston North End F.C. players
English Football League representative players
Association football midfielders
FA Cup Final players